The Water Babies, Water Babies, or Water Baby may refer to:

 The Water-Babies, A Fairy Tale for a Land Baby, a novel by Charles Kingsley published in 1863
 The Water Babies (film), a 1978 live action/animated film based on the novel
 Water Babies (1935 film), a 1935 animated short film in the Silly Symphonies series
 The Water Babies, a 2003 musical by Jason Carr and Gary Yershon, based on the novel, directed by Jeremy Sams
 Water Babies (album), a 1976 album by Miles Davis 
 The Water Babies, a UK band who released the 2005 single "Under the Tree"
"Water Baby" (song), a song by English musician Tom Misch
Water birth, a childbirth that occurs in water
Water baby syndrome, an older, alternative name for hydrocephalus
Mizuko kuyō, the stillborn, aborted, and miscarried in Japan
Water Baby (film), a 2016 short film

See also 
 "Water Baby Blues", an instrumental by Merl Lindsay